These are the results of the Men's Middle-Heavyweight Weightlifting Event (– 90 kg) at the 1980 Olympic Weightlifting competition in Moscow. A total of 18 men competed in this event, limited to competitors with a maximum body weight of 90 kilograms.

Each weightlifter had three attempts for both the snatch and clean and jerk lifting methods. The total of the best successful lift of each method was used to determine the final rankings and medal winners. Competition took place on 27 July in the Izmailovo Sports Palace.

Results

References 
 

Weightlifting at the 1980 Summer Olympics